Zeytin-Kosh is a mountain in Crimea and the third highest mountain in the Crimean Mountains. Its height stands 1537 meters above sea level.

Etymology
The name of the mountain is of Crimean Tatar origin and literally means "olive kosh" (zeytün or in the southern coast dialect zeytin - "olive, olive tree"; qoş - "koshara, sheepfold").

Notes

References 

Crimean Mountains
One-thousanders of Ukraine